Glaciers in South America develop exclusively on the Andes and are subject to the Andes various climatic regimes namely the Tropical Andes, Dry Andes and the Wet Andes. Apart from this there is a wide range of altitudes on which glaciers develop from 5000 m in the Altiplano mountains and volcanoes to reaching sealevel as tidewater glaciers from San Rafael Lagoon (45° S) and southwards. South America hosts two large ice fields, the Northern and Southern Patagonian Ice Fields, of which the second is the largest contiguous body of glaciers in extrapolar regions.  By surface about 80% of South America's glaciers lie in Chile.

List of glaciers

Argentina
Perito Moreno Glacier 
Polish Glacier
Southern Patagonian Ice Field - Argentina/Chile
Upsala Glacier
Spegazzini Glacier
Mayo Glacier
Onelli Glacier
Torre Glacier
Negro Glacier
Frías Glacier
Alerce Glacier
Castaño Overo Glacier
Manso Glacier
Peulla Glacier
Casa Pangue Glacier
Río Blanco Glacier
Torrecillas Glacier
Ventisquero Negro
Viedma Glacier
Lagrimas Glacier

Bolivia
Chacaltaya

Chile
Amalia Glacier
Colonia Glacier
Bernardo Glacier
Brüggen Glacier or Pío XI Glacier
Dickson Glacier
Francia Glacier
Garibaldi Glacier
Grandes Ventisqueros
Gran Campo Nevado
Grey Glacier
Holanda Glacier
Italia Glacier
Jorge Montt Glacier
Juncal Norte Glacier
Juncal Sur Glacier
La Paloma Glacier
Leones Glacier
Los Perros Glacier
Marinelli Glacier
Nef Glacier
Mocho-Choshuenco
Northern Patagonian Ice Field
O'Higgins Glacier
Pingo Glacier
Queulat Glacier
Romanche Glacier
San Francisco Glacier
San Quintín Glacier 
San Rafael Glacier
Serrano Glacier
Soler Glacier
Southern Patagonian Ice Field - Chile/Argentina
Steffen Glacier
Stoppani Glacier
Tyndall Glacier or Geike Glacier
Universidad Glacier
Yelcho Glacier

Colombia
Nevado del Ruiz
Ritacuba Blanco
Sierra Nevada de Santa Marta
Snow Mountain of Quindio

Ecuador
Antisana
El Altar
Cayambe
Chimborazo
Cotopaxi

Peru
Quelccaya Ice Cap
Pastoruri Glacier
Artesonraju Glacier 
Llaca Glacier 
Arhuey Glacier
Veronica Glacier

Venezuela
Humboldt Glacier

See also
Geography of South America

References

 
South America